The surname Tardy has several origins. It is an old French family name. It may also refer to a number of families of Hungarian nobility: Tardy alias Lélek, Tardy alias Pap, Tardy alias Szeles, Tardy de Csaholy, Tardy de Kisár, Tardy de Kőröstopa et Mezőtelegd, Tardy de Tard.

Notable people with the surname include:
 Donald Tardy (born 1970), American drummer
 Fernand Tardy (1919–2017), French politician
 Gregory Tardy (born 1966), American jazz saxophonist
Jacque Alexander Tardy (1767–1827), French pirate
James Tardy, (between 1773 and 1787 – 1835), Irish naturalist
 John Tardy (born 1968), American singer
 Joshua Tardy, American politician
 Lionel Tardy (born 1966), French politician
Louis-Marie-François Tardy de Montravel
Richard Tardy (born 1950),  a French football manager

References

French-language surnames
Hungarian-language surnames